The following is a list of notable people associated with the University of Central Missouri, located in the American city of Warrensburg, Missouri.

Notable alumni

Politics and government
Rex Barnett (born 1938), politician and former officer of the Missouri State Highway Patrol
 Wallace H. Graham, physician to the President (1945–1953); major general
 James Kirkpatrick, served as 32nd Missouri secretary of state
 Phill Kline, former Kansas attorney general; law professor at Liberty University
 Randy Pike, member of the Missouri House of Representatives
Darrell Pollock, former member of the Missouri House of Representatives
James B. Potter Jr., member of the Los Angeles City Council (1963–1971)
Carl Turner, member of the Kansas House of Representatives

Arts and media
 Dale Carnegie, author of How to Win Friends and Influence People
 David Cook, 2008 American Idol winner
 Grant Curtis, executive producer of Spider-Man, Spider-Man 2 and Spider-Man 3
Thomas Hollyman, photojournalist
 David Holsinger, wind ensemble composer
 Allan Kayser, actor who played Bubba Higgins on Mama's Family
 Erich "Mancow" Muller, host of Mancow's Morning Madhouse, a Chicago-based radio show syndicated across the U.S.
 Brian Thomas Smith, actor known for The Big Bang Theory
 Tolga Çevik, actor from Turkey

Education
 Robert P. Foster, president of Northwest Missouri State University from 1964 to 1977
 Christopher Bell (1974–2009), scholar, author, and president of the Society for Disability Studies
 Lawrence Walkup (1914–2002), president of Northern Arizona University

Science and technology
 Thomas Kunz, researcher notable for insights into bat ecology
 Gregg Miller, inventor of Neuticles and author; 2005 recipient of Ig Nobel Prize for Medicine
 Richard Schelp, mathematician; frequent research collaborator with Paul Erdős  
 David Steward, CEO of World Wide Technology, Inc., the world's largest African American-owned company
 Curtis Cooper, mathematician known for discovering largest known prime number

Sports

Athletes

 Ron Tabb, marathon runner

 Mark Curp, former world and American record-holder in the half-marathon
 Todd Devoe, wide receiver in the NFL and Arena Football League
 Roderick Green, defensive end and linebacker for the San Francisco 49ers
 Maury John, basketball coach at Drake University (1958–1971) and Iowa State University (1971–1974)
 Vern Kennedy, former pitcher of the Chicago White Sox, best known for throwing the first no-hitter in Comiskey Park
 Toby Korrodi, quarterback signed by the Arizona Cardinals in 2007 and cut in training camp
 Chuck Palumbo, professional wrestler
 Butch "Hacksaw" Reed, professional wrestler
 Jerry Reuss, former pitcher best known for his years with the Los Angeles Dodgers
 Delanie Walker, tight end for the Tennessee Titans
 Colston Weatherington, former NFL and AFL player
 Jeff Wright, former nose tackle for the Buffalo Bills
 Anna Glennon, jet ski racer
 Jim Chaney, offensive coordinator for the Tennessee Volunteers
 Katie Sowers, offensive assistant for the San Francisco 49ers; first openly-gay coach in NFL history and first female coach to coach in a Super Bowl
 Zach Davidson, Tight End and Punter for the Buffalo Bills, drafted in the fifth round of the 2021 NFL Draft by the Minnesota Vikings.

Owners and executives
 Russ Ball, NFL executive
 Jim Crane, owner of Houston Astros baseball team

Other
 Jeffrey Lundgren, self-proclaimed prophet; former leader of a cult group and convicted murderer
 James O. McKinsey, founder of McKinsey & Company
 Carrie Nation, leader of the temperance movement

Notable faculty
Phog Allen, basketball coach known as the "father of basketball coaching"; spent majority of career at the University of Kansas and namesake of Allen Fieldhouse
 Kim Anderson, replaced Frank Haith as head basketball coach of the Missouri Tigers
 Gene Bartow, replaced John Wooden as basketball coach of the UCLA Bruins
 Mildred Barnes, basketball coach from 1971-1980, member of the U.S. Olympic Women's Basketball Committee from 1965 through 1972 (chair from 1974 to 1976), inducted into the Women's Basketball Hall of Fame in 2000
 Curtis Cooper, mathematics
 Joe B. Hall, replaced Adolph Rupp as basketball coach of the Kentucky Wildcats
 Christopher Jargocki, physics
 Jim Johnson, associate athletic director (2003 to 2005); current athletic director for Pittsburg State University
 Mike Racy, vice president for law, policy, and strategy (2013–2016); current commissioner of the Mid-America Intercollegiate Athletic Association

References

External links
 University of Central Missouri Alumni Association website

University of Central Missouri people